The 2nd constituency of Bouches-du-Rhône is a French legislative constituency in Bouches-du-Rhône. The constituency covers the southern and residential coast of the city of Marseille.

Boundaries 
The constituency includes the following areas:

 7th arrondissement of Marseille
 8th arrondissement of Marseille

Deputies

Elections

2022

 
 
 
 
 
 
 
|-
| colspan="8" bgcolor="#E9E9E9"|
|-

2017

2012

|- style="background-color:#E9E9E9;text-align:center;"
! colspan="2" rowspan="2" style="text-align:left;" | Candidate
! rowspan="2" colspan="2" style="text-align:left;" | Party
! colspan="2" | 1st round
! colspan="2" | 2nd round
|- style="background-color:#E9E9E9;text-align:center;"
! width="75" | Votes
! width="30" | %
! width="75" | Votes
! width="30" | %
|-
| style="background-color:" |
| style="text-align:left;" | Dominique Tian
| style="text-align:left;" | Union for a Popular Movement
| UMP
| 
| 41.06%
| 
| 58.46%
|-
| style="background-color:" |
| style="text-align:left;" | Jean-Pierre Mignard
| style="text-align:left;" | Socialist Party
| PS
| 
| 29.00%
| 
| 41.54%
|-
| style="background-color:" |
| style="text-align:left;" | Alexandre Bartolini
| style="text-align:left;" | National Front
| FN
| 
| 17.84%
| colspan="2" style="text-align:left;" |
|-
| style="background-color:" |
| style="text-align:left;" | Christian Pellicani
| style="text-align:left;" | Left Front
| FG
| 
| 6.69%
| colspan="2" style="text-align:left;" |
|-
| style="background-color:" |
| style="text-align:left;" | Florence Bistagne
| style="text-align:left;" | 
| CEN
| 
| 2.35%
| colspan="2" style="text-align:left;" |
|-
| style="background-color:" |
| style="text-align:left;" | Dominique Surry
| style="text-align:left;" | Ecologist
| ECO
| 
| 1.17%
| colspan="2" style="text-align:left;" |
|-
| style="background-color:" |
| style="text-align:left;" | Pierre-Marie Sanson
| style="text-align:left;" | Ecologist
| ECO
| 
| 0.63%
| colspan="2" style="text-align:left;" |
|-
| style="background-color:" |
| style="text-align:left;" | Louis Jacques Di Stefano
| style="text-align:left;" | Miscellaneous Right
| DVD
| 
| 0.52%
| colspan="2" style="text-align:left;" |
|-
| style="background-color:" |
| style="text-align:left;" | Marie Contaux
| style="text-align:left;" | Far Left
| EXG
| 
| 0.29%
| colspan="2" style="text-align:left;" |
|-
| style="background-color:" |
| style="text-align:left;" | Patricia Dupuy
| style="text-align:left;" | The Greens
| VEC
| 
| 0.25%
| colspan="2" style="text-align:left;" |
|-
| style="background-color:" |
| style="text-align:left;" | Brigitte Espaze
| style="text-align:left;" | Far Left
| EXG
| 
| 0.21%
| colspan="2" style="text-align:left;" |
|-
| colspan="8" style="background-color:#E9E9E9;"|
|- style="font-weight:bold"
| colspan="4" style="text-align:left;" | Total
| 
| 100%
| 
| 100%
|-
| colspan="8" style="background-color:#E9E9E9;"|
|-
| colspan="4" style="text-align:left;" | Registered voters
| 
| style="background-color:#E9E9E9;"|
| 
| style="background-color:#E9E9E9;"|
|-
| colspan="4" style="text-align:left;" | Blank/Void ballots
| 
| 0.81%
| 
| 2.92%
|-
| colspan="4" style="text-align:left;" | Turnout
| 
| 59.03%
| 
| 54.14%
|-
| colspan="4" style="text-align:left;" | Abstentions
| 
| 40.97%
| 
| 45.86%
|-
| colspan="8" style="background-color:#E9E9E9;"|
|- style="font-weight:bold"
| colspan="6" style="text-align:left;" | Result
| colspan="2" style="background-color:" | UMP HOLD
|}

2007

2002

 
 
 
 
|-
| colspan="8" bgcolor="#E9E9E9"|
|-

1997

 
 
 
 
 
 
|-
| colspan="8" bgcolor="#E9E9E9"|
|-

References

2